Coolawanyah Station, also spelt as Coolawaya Station, is a pastoral lease and sheep station located approximately  north of Tom Price,  south east of Karratha and  south west of Port Hedland, in the Shire of Ashburton, part of the Pilbara region of Western Australia. The property shares a boundary with Millstream Chichester National Park to the west.

The property was acquired by Roy Parsons and his partners in 1922 after he served in the navy during World War I. Parsons bought out his partners during the next few years, eventually owning the  leasehold outright.

During the 1950s the property switched from sheep to cattle after suffering from dingo attacks. In 1956 Roy's youngest son, Les, took over management of the property.

Transportation 
The locality is served by the Coolawanyah Station Airport .

See also
List of ranches and stations

References

Pastoral leases in Western Australia
Stations (Australian agriculture)
Shire of Ashburton